Current Medical Research and Opinion is a peer-reviewed medical journal established in 1972. It is published monthly by Taylor and Francis Group.

Abstracting and indexing 
The journal is abstracted and indexed by MEDLINE/PubMed, EMBASE/Excerpta Medica, Current Contents/Clinical Medicine, Science Citation Index, CAB Abstracts, PASCAL, and PsycINFO. According to Current Medical Research and Opinion, the journal's 2020 impact factor is 2.580.

References

External links 

Publications established in 1972
General medical journals
Taylor & Francis academic journals
Monthly journals
English-language journals